How the Other Half Lives is a British documentary series that began airing on 27 October 2015 on Channel 5. The programme is presented by Eamonn Holmes and Ruth Langsford.

The first series aired from 27 October 2015 until 1 December 2015, the second series from 13 September until 18 October 2016, the third series from 3 July until 17 July 2017, and the fourth series from 14 July until 14 December 2018. The fifth series started in March 2019.

Synopsis
Holmes and Langsford find out what life is like for some of the richest people in Britain and overseas.

Episodes

Transmissions
Official viewing figures are from BARB.

Series 1 (2015)
Official viewing figures are from BARB.

Series 2 (2016)
Official viewing figures are from BARB.

Christmas special
Official viewing figures are from BARB.

Series 3 (2017)
Official viewing figures are from BARB.

Series 4 (2018)
Official viewing figures are from BARB.

Series 5 (2019)
Official viewing figures are from BARB.

References

External links

2015 British television series debuts
Television series by ITV Studios
Channel 5 (British TV channel) original programming
British documentary television series
English-language television shows